The Cathedral of Miranda do Douro is a Roman Catholic cathedral in Miranda do Douro, Portugal. It is the co-cathedral of the Diocese of Bragança-Miranda, which has its see in the Cathedral of Braganza.

Work on the cathedral began on 24 May 1552. Confirmation of its completion was sent to Pope Paul V in 1609. In 1770 the see was moved to Braganza by Pope Clement XIV and the Cathedral of Miranda do Douro became the co-cathedral.

Since 16 June 1910, the cathedral is protected as one of the National monuments of Portugal.

References

Miranda
National monuments in Bragança District
Churches in Bragança District
1609 establishments in Portugal